Acmaeops proteus is a species of the Lepturinae subfamily in the long-horned beetle family. This beetle is distributed in Canada, Mexico, and the United States.

Fungi, Paecilomyces farinosus entomopathogenic species parasite on adult beetles.

Subtaxa 
There is one varieties in species:
 Acmaeops proteus durangoensis Linsley & Chemsak, 1972
 Acmaeops proteus proteus (Kirby, 1837)

References

Lepturinae
Taxa named by William Kirby (entomologist)
Beetles described in 1837